Halonymphidae is a family of bivalves belonging to the order Anomalodesmata.

Genera:
 Halonympha Dall & Smith, 1886

References

Anomalodesmata
Bivalve families